The Dromnessund Bridge is a bridge that crosses the Dromnessundet strait between the mainland and the island of Skardsøya in the municipality of Aure in Møre og Romsdal county, Norway.

See also
List of bridges in Norway
List of bridges in Norway by length
List of bridges
List of bridges by length

References

External links
Picture of the bridge

Bridges in Møre og Romsdal
Bridges completed in 1996
Aure, Norway